Kotwica Kołobrzeg is a football club based in Kołobrzeg, Poland. It was founded in 1946. Since 2022, the club plays in II liga.

Notable players to have played for Kotwica Kołobrzeg include Sérgio Batata, Piotr Dubiela, Adam Frączczak and Grzegorz Lewandowski.

Current squad

References

External links 

 
 Kotwica Kołobrzeg at the 90minut.pl  website (Polish)

 
Kotwica Kołobrzeg
Association football clubs established in 1946
1946 establishments in Poland
Sport in West Pomeranian Voivodeship
Kołobrzeg